Pyrrha or Pyrra was a small town on the Maeander River, opposite to Miletus; it was 50 stadia distant from the mouth of the river.

The site of Pyrrha is tentatively located near modern Sarıkemer in Asiatic Turkey.

References

Populated places in ancient Caria
Former populated places in Turkey
History of Aydın Province
Söke District